Saint-Mary de Colamine Church is a building in the French town of Vodable, in Puy-de-Dôme.

History 
Located in Sub-Colamine Vodable, Saint-Mary de Colmaine is a small Romanesque church of the 6th century.

The building consists of a nave accompanied by an incomplete south aisle; a transept; a steeple rising above the crossing of the transept; an apse with cut sides whose roof follows the shape of a hemicycle; and a north-facing chapel. The frameless roof is covered with slate. The interior of the transept is covered with a dome resting on small arcades in the trunk, resting on shelves edge decorated with tablets. These tablets are medallions decorated with geometric decorations, foliage, or human heads. The double-aux fall on the capitals carved in the foliage of the columns arranged at the angles.

Interior 
The church contains five statues classified as historical monuments, four of which are medieval.

References 

Churches in Puy-de-Dôme
6th-century churches
Ancient Roman buildings and structures in France